Uchagaon was one of the 224 vidhan sabha seats in the state assembly of Karnataka, in India. It was part of Belagavi Lok Sabha constituency, which is adjacent to Chikkodi Lok Sabha constituency. The seat was a stronghold of Maharashtra Ekikaran Samiti (MES). Since the Samiti was not an official party, its candidates contested as independent.

Member of Assembly 
 1967: N P Bharaman (Ind)
 1972: Pawashe, Prabhakar Annappa (प्रभाकर पावशे, Ind / MES) 
 1978: Prabhakar Anapa Pawashe (Independent / MES) with 24,377 votes
 1983: Basavant Iroji Patil (Independent / MES) with 41,940 votes  
 1985: Patil, Basavant Iroji (Independent) 
 1989: Patil Basavant Iroji (Independent) 
 1994: Patil Basavant Iroji (Independent) 
 1999: Manohar Punnappa Kadolkar (BJP), with 33,990 votes 
 2004: Manohar Kallappa Kinekar, IND / MES) with 42,483 votes 
 This seat was made defunct after the assembly segments were redrawn in 2008. 2009 wards : See Belagavi Rural Assembly constituency

References

Former assembly constituencies of Karnataka